Latirostrum is a monotypic moth genus of the family Erebidae. Its only species, Latirostrum bisacutum, is found in Japan and Uttar Pradesh, India. Both the genus and species were first described by George Hampson in 1895.

References

Calpinae
Monotypic moth genera